The 1969 Texas Tech Red Raiders football team represented Texas Tech University in the Southwest Conference (SWC) during the 1969 NCAA University Division football season. In their ninth and final season under head coach J. T. King, the Red Raiders compiled a 5–5 record (4–3 against conference opponents), tied for third place in the SWC, and were outscored by opponents by a combined total of 240 to 212. The team's statistical leaders included Charles Napper with 901 passing yards, Danny Hardaway with 483 rushing yards, and David May with 340 receiving yards. The team played its home games at Clifford B. & Audrey Jones Stadium.

Schedule

Roster

References

Texas Tech
Texas Tech Red Raiders football seasons
Texas Tech Red Raiders football